AWOL O'Shea is a British women's road bicycle racing team, established in 2017. Since 2021 has been registered as a UCI women’s continental team which participates in elite women's races.

National champions
2021
 Ireland Track (Scratch race), Autumn Collins

References

https://www.uci.org/team-details/17244

External links

UCI Women's Teams
Cycling teams based in the United Kingdom
Cycling teams established in 2020